Richard Ellis (born April 2, 1938) is an American marine biologist, author, and illustrator. He is a research associate in the American Museum of Natural History's division of paleontology, special adviser to the American Cetacean Society, and a member of the Explorers Club. He was U.S. delegate to International Whaling Commission from 1980 to 1990.

His paintings have been exhibited in galleries and museums around the world, and his murals can be seen in the Denver Museum of Natural History, the New Bedford Whaling Museum in Massachusetts, and Whaleworld, a museum in Albany, Western Australia. He is the author of more than 100 magazine articles, which have appeared in National Geographic, Natural History, Audubon, Curator, National Wildlife, Geo, Australian Geographic, and Reader's Digest. He has written 23 books, including The Book of Sharks, The Book of Whales, Dolphins and Porpoises, Men and Whales, Great White Shark (with John McCosker), Encyclopedia of the Sea, Aquagenesis: The Origin and Evolution of Life in the Sea, Deep Atlantic, Monsters of the Sea, Imagining Atlantis, The Search for the Giant Squid, Tiger Bone & Rhino Horn, No Turning Back: The Life and Death of Animal Species, Sea Dragons: Predators of Prehistoric Seas, Tuna, The Empty Ocean, and Swordfish: A Biography of the Ocean Gladiator. On Thin Ice looks into the changing world of polar bears and highlights their problems caused by global warming and disappearing Arctic ice. In 2011 the University Press of Kansas published The Great Sperm Whale: A Natural History of the Ocean's Most Magnificent and Mysterious Creature. Richard Ellis curated a show on sharks in art for the Fort Lauderdale Art Museum, from May 2012 to January 2013.

References

External links
Profiles in Science in the New York Times

Cetologists
American marine biologists
American science writers
Living people
20th-century American painters
American male painters
21st-century American painters
American muralists
People associated with the American Museum of Natural History
1938 births
20th-century American male artists